Mochdre Sports Football Club is a Welsh football team based in the village of Mochdre, located to the west of Colwyn Bay, Wales.  The team currently play in the North Wales Coast East Football League Premier Division, which is at the fourth tier of the Welsh football league system.

History
The club was formed in 1929 and played in the 1929–30 Vale of Conwy League and through various guises, Mochdre has had a football team ever since.

From the mid 1980s the club played in the Welsh Alliance League for seven seasons.

Following the en bloc resignation of the club committee and management the club nearly ceased to exist in the summer of 2012.

For the 2014–15 season the club rejoined the Welsh Alliance League Division Two from the Vale of Conwy League.

In 2020 the team was accepted into the Premier Division of the new North Wales Coast East Football League.

Honours

Vale of Conwy Football League Division One - Champions (5): 1958–59 (as Mochdre Youth); 1976–77; 1983–84; 1984–85; 1992–93;
Vale of Conwy Football League Division Two - Champions (4): 1970–71; 1979–80 (reserves); 1982–83 (reserves); 1985–86 (reserves)
Vale of Conwy League Challenge Cup - Winners (2):  1992–93; 2000–01
Clwyd Football League Division One – Champions: 2004–05
Clwyd Cup - Winners: 2012–13
President's Cup  - Winners: 2012–13
Premier Cup  - Winners: 2013–14
Ron Jones Trophy – Winners (4): 1978–79 (reserves); 1983–84 (reserves); 2000–01; 2001–02
Frank Tyldesey Trophy – Winners (3): 1989–90 (reserves); 1990–91 (reserves); 1992–93
Cawley Bros Trophy – Winners: 1989-99

External links
Official club website
Official club Twitter
Official club Facebook
Mochdre Sports Association club page

References

Football clubs in Wales
1929 establishments in Wales
Association football clubs established in 1929
Sport in Conwy County Borough
Welsh Alliance League clubs
North Wales Coast Football League clubs
Vale of Conwy Football League clubs
Clwyd Football League clubs
Colwyn Bay